The 2014 Thai FA Cup Final was the 21st final of Thailand's domestic football cup competition, the FA Cup. The final was played at Supachalasai Stadium in Bangkok on 9 November 2014. The match was contested by Bangkok Glass, who beat Chiangrai United 6–5 after Penalty shootout of the draw 1-1 in their semi-final, and Chonburi who beat Suphanburi 1–0 in the match. The match was won by Bangkok Glass, defeating Chonburi 1–0 through a goal scored by Lazarus Kaimbi.

Road to the final

Note: In all results below, the score of the finalist is given first (H: home; A: away; TPL: Clubs from Thai Premier League; D1: Clubs from Thai Division 1 League; D2: Clubs from Regional League Division 2).

Match

Details

Assistant referees:
 Amnad Pongmanee
 Kringsak Kringsongkhram
Fourth official:
 Thaweep Inkaew

MATCH RULES
90 minutes.
30 minutes of extra-time if necessary.
Penalty shootout if scores still level.
Nine named substitutes
Maximum of 3 substitutions.

2014
1